Tamarind Tree is a Vietnamese restaurant in Seattle, in the U.S. state of Washington.

Description 
The Vietnamese restaurant Tamarind Tree is located in Seattle's Chinatown-International District. The menu has included muc nhoi thit (grilled squid with ground pork), banh mi hap (steamed baguette), and green mango salad. The spring rolls have fried tofu, peanuts, coconut, jicama, carrots, and herbs. The restaurant has also served bánh xèo, pho, clams with pineapple anchovy sauce, steamed prawn coconut rice cakes, banana cake, and coconut milk. The green papaya salad has prawns, jicama, and roasted peanuts.

Fodor's says, "Wildly popular with savvy diners from all across the city, this Vietnamese haunt on the eastern side of the I.D. really doesn't look like much from the outside, especially because the entrance is through a grungy parking lot (which it shares with Sichuanese Cuisine restaurant), but once you're inside, the elegantly simple, large, and warm space is extremely welcoming... Service is attentive, but the waits can be long, even with reservations."

Reception 
In 2011, Allecia Vermillion included Tamarind Tree in Eater Seattle lists of 38 "essential" Seattle restaurants. Shalini Gujavarty selected the restaurant for similar lists in 2012. The website's Jenise Silva included the green papaya salad in a 2018 list of "11 Sumptuous Salads in Seattle". In 2020, during the COVID-19 pandemic, Gabe Guarente included Tamarind Tree in Eater Seattle's overview of "where to get fantastic Vietnamese food in Seattle for takeout and delivery". Writers for the site also included the restaurant in a 2022 list of 15 "lively Seattle restaurants for big group dinners".

See also 

 List of Vietnamese restaurants
 Vietnamese in Seattle

References

External links 

 
 Tamarind Tree at Zomato

Chinatown–International District, Seattle
Vietnamese restaurants in Seattle